Kelly Guard (born June 10, 1983) is a Canadian former professional ice hockey goaltender. He last played for HC Pustertal-Val Pusteria in Italy's Serie A. He helped lead the Kelowna Rockets of the Western Hockey League (WHL) to a Memorial Cup championship in 2004.

Career

Playing career
Guard was born in Prince Albert, Saskatchewan. He spent his entire junior career with the WHL's Kelowna Rockets. In 2002–03, his first of two seasons with the team, he led the Rockets to a WHL Championship and a berth in the Memorial Cup tournament in Quebec City. The Rockets lost 2–1 to the Hull Olympiques in the semi-final. Guard had another stellar season with the Rockets in 2003–04, posting 44 wins in 62 games. Although Kelowna lost in the third round of the WHL playoffs that season, the city was chosen to host the 2004 Memorial Cup and as such the Rockets received an automatic berth in the tournament. Guard helped lead the team to the franchise's first Memorial Cup Championship as they defeated the Gatineau Olympiques 2–1 in the final. For his efforts, Guard was awarded both the Hap Emms Memorial Trophy and the Stafford Smythe Memorial Trophy as the Memorial Cup's top goaltender and most valuable player, respectively. He was also named to the tournament's First All-Star Team, and to the WHL's First All-Star Team for that season. In all, Guard posted an 83-24 record over his two seasons with Kelowna.

Guard was never selected in the NHL Entry Draft, but was signed to a professional contract by the National Hockey League's Ottawa Senators in 2004. He made his professional debut during the 2004–05 season playing for Ottawa's ECHL affiliate, the Charlotte Checkers. He spent the following two seasons with Ottawa's top minor league affiliate, the Binghamton Senators of the American Hockey League. He struggled with the team, posting a 36-44-4 record.

The Senators opted not to offer Guard a new contract after the 2006-07 season and the goaltender became a free agent. In November 2007, Guard signed with the China Sharks of Asia League Ice Hockey, though his stint with the team was brief. He had similarly brief stints with the Vienna Capitals of Erste Bank Eishockey Liga and Junost Minsk of the Belarusian Extraleague before signing with Serie A's HC Pustertal-Val Pusteria.

After sustaining a groin injury in an October 2008 game, Guard's contract with Pustertal-Val Pusteria was terminated by mutual consent. Although he said that "the city, the environment and the teammates were outstanding," Guard was disappointed with the level of play in Serie A and, already contemplating retirement, the injury helped make his decision final. In November 2008 Guard announced his retirement from professional hockey.

Post-playing career

Coaching
On November 12, 2021, Hockey Canada announced the rosters for three men's under-17 teams for the Capital City Challenge.  Guard was named goaltending coach for Canada White.  The Capital City Challenge served as a one-time event to replace to the World U-17 Hockey Challenge, which was cancelled due to the Covid-19 pandemic.  It also gave an opportunity to the Canada’s National Women’s Team to compete as part of its centralization schedule.

On June 15, 2022, Hockey Canada announced 20 Canadian Hockey League (CHL) coaches for their under-17 and under-18 summer programs, camps, and various events.  Guard was selected as the goaltending coach for the under-18 side that competed at the Hlinka Gretzky Cup.

Regular season and playoffs

Awards

Records

References

External links

Kelly Guard biography at hockeygoalies.org

1983 births
Living people
Binghamton Senators players
Canadian expatriate ice hockey players in Austria
Canadian expatriate ice hockey players in China
Canadian expatriate ice hockey players in Italy
Canadian ice hockey goaltenders
Charlotte Checkers (1993–2010) players
China Dragon players
HC Pustertal Wölfe players
Kelowna Rockets players
Ice hockey people from Saskatchewan
Sportspeople from Prince Albert, Saskatchewan
Vienna Capitals players